Sanchari is a 1981 Indian Malayalam-language film produced and directed by Boban Kunchacko and written by P. K. Sarangapani. The film stars Prem Nazir, Jayan, K. P. Ummer, Mohanlal, and Adoor Bhasi in substantial roles. The film features songs composed by K. J. Yesudas and background score by Guna Singh.

Cast

Prem Nazir as Sumesh and Suresh (double role)
Jayan as Bhargavan
K. P. Ummer as Mammad
Mohanlal as Sekher
Sankaradi as Sankaran
Shubha as Shubha
Unnimary as Sumuki
Santhakumari as Saudamini
Roja Ramani as Sumam
N. Govindankutty as Vaasu
G. K. Pillai as Keshavan
Shyama as Young Sumam
Sukumari as Kotha/Kadambari
Thikkurussy Sukumaran Nair as Sundareshan Nair
Bahadoor as Sankaran
Alummoodan as E. D. Palpu
S. P. Pillai as Palpu's father
Premji as Vaidyar
Jagathy Sreekumar as Mani
Kaduvakulam Antony as Hospital attendant

Soundtrack
The film features songs composed by K. J. Yesudas with lyrics by Yusufali Kechery. Background score was provided by Guna Singh.

Release
The film was released on  26 February 1981, after the death of actor Jayan. It had an average run in theatres.

References

External links
 

1981 films
1980s Malayalam-language films